Most display manufacturers label their glossy screens under a variety of brand names:

Manufacturers
Glossy display branding